On the 26 February 2023 a football game of the Turkish Süper Lig between Besiktas from Istanbul and Antalyaspor from Antalya took place in the Vodafone Park in Istanbul. During the match, when the clock showed 4 Minutes and 17 seconds, the fans hurled stuffed toys to the pitch for the children that survived the devastating earthquake from February 2023.

Background 
On the 6 February 2023, Turkey was struck by a devastating earthquake which caused over 45''000 deaths. The Turkish Government is criticized for its insufficient response to the earthquake by the fans of both the fans of Fenerbahçe S.K. and also Besiktas.

Match stopped at 4:17 
The match was stopped when the clock showed 4 Minutes and 17 seconds in memory of the victims of the earthquake on the 6 February 2023, which took place on 4.17am. Following the fans hurled toys, berets and scarves on the football pitch meant to cheer up the children in the earthquake region and on the billboard in the stadium, the names of the affected provinces were displayed. The action was organized by the fans before the match when the toys were distributed among the fans in a coordinated manner. The action would be called "this toy is my friend".

Anti-Government protests 
The match would also become known due the fans demands for the Turkish Government to resign. The crowd protested over the lack of responses the Government gave in the aftermacth of the earthquake.  Over a video from the online news portal Haber, it was shown how some protesters were expelled from the tribune by the police. 

Devlet Bahçeli, the political ally of the President Recep Tayyip Erdoğan from the right-wing Nationalist Movement Party (MHP), fiercely criticized the fans demand for the Government to resign and canceled his membership in the club. Sermet Ay and Semih Yalçın, both also lawmakers of the MHP then followed suit and also canceled their memberships. From the Justice and Development Party (AKP)  Yavuz Subaşı resigned from the club as well. The lawmaker of the Republican Peoples Party (CHP) Gürsel Tekin announced that he would come up for financial losses the clubs faced over the cancelation of the memberships.

See also 
Fenerbahçe – Konyaspor match of 2023

References 

Beşiktaş Football